Philipp Orter (born 16 February 1994) is an Austrian nordic combined skier. He competed in the World Cup 2015 season.

He represented Austria at the FIS Nordic World Ski Championships 2015 in Falun.

References

External links

1994 births
Living people
Austrian male Nordic combined skiers
FIS Nordic World Ski Championships medalists in Nordic combined
Sportspeople from Villach